The 41st Division was one of the divisions of the People's Army of the Republic that were organized during the Spanish Civil War on the basis of the Mixed Brigades. It took part in the battles of Teruel, Alfambra and Levante.

History 
The unit was formed in April 1937, on the Teruel front. It was made up of the 57th, 58th and 83rd mixed brigades. The division was initially assigned to the "Teruel Operations Army", It was subsequently attached to the XIII Army Corps. The 41st Division, attached to the XIX Army Corps, was present during the Battle of Teruel.

In the face of the nationalist offensive on the Levante front, the division was added to the so-called "Army Corps of the Coast", defending the coastal sector; later, it was attached to the XXII Army Corps. In June the 41st Division was located at the height of Castellón de la Plana, which was lost on June 14. Later, the unit went to act as a reserve in the region of Sagunto-Almenara, undergoing a reorganization process.

Some time later it was sent as reinforcement to the Extremadura front, to fight in the Battle of Merida pocket. During the fighting that followed, the unit was severely broken, having to undergo a profound reorganization. The unit was assigned to the VII Army Corps.

Command 
Commanders
 Manuel Eixea Vilar;
 Luis Menéndez Maseras;
 Antonio Cortina Pascual;
 Damián Fernández Calderón;

Commissars
 Marcos García Callejo, of the CNT;
 Félix Navarro Serrano, of the PCE;
 Germán Clemente de la Cruz;

Chiefs of Staff
 Agustín Fuster Picó;
 José Rodríguez Pérez;
 Manuel Farra Cerdán;

Organization

Notes

References

Bibliography
 
 
 
 
 
 
 

Military units and formations established in 1937
Military units and formations disestablished in 1939
Divisions of Spain
Military units and formations of the Spanish Civil War
Military history of Spain
Armed Forces of the Second Spanish Republic
1937 establishments in Spain
1939 disestablishments in Spain